Marcel Paterni (September 22, 1936 – July 13, 2019) was a French weightlifter of the 1950s and 1960s, who was dubbed "the French strongman of the Gaullian era" by European expert in heavy athletics Emmanuel Legeard.

Early life
Of Corsican descent, Paterni was born in Casablanca, Morocco, on September 22, 1936. He was introduced to weightlifting by his older brother and started training in Casablanca at 16 years of age. In 1954, he was drafted into the French Army and stationed in Algeria during the Algerian War. In 1956, he moved to Paris, France.

Career
Paterni competed at the 1956 Summer Olympics, 1960 Summer Olympics, and 1964 Summer Olympics. As a light-heavyweight (182 lb or 82.5 kg), Paterni set the World record at 150.5 kg in the Olympic press the 25 July 1959 in Massiac, France.
In 1965, he retired from competition and turned to coaching. He eventually became head coach of the French Olympic weightlifting team in the mid-eighties. During his early coaching career in the 1960s Marcel Paterni pioneered a number of revolutionary methods and techniques of conditioning, like high-altitude training or 3-dimensional strength platform training.

References 

1936 births
2019 deaths
French people of Corsican descent
French male weightlifters
French strength athletes
Olympic weightlifters of France
Weightlifters at the 1956 Summer Olympics
Weightlifters at the 1960 Summer Olympics
Weightlifters at the 1964 Summer Olympics
World record setters in weightlifting
European Weightlifting Championships medalists
World Weightlifting Championships medalists
20th-century French people